One Logan Square is a high-rise building located in the Logan Square neighborhood of Philadelphia, Pennsylvania. The building stands at 400 ft (122 m) with 31 floors, and was completed in 1983.  The architectural firm responsible for the building's design is Kohn Pedersen Fox Associates PC. The building and accompanying Four Seasons Hotel (now The Logan Hotel) were developed by a joint venture of INA and Urban Investment and Development Co. for $120 million.  As the zoning laws at the time prohibited buildings taller than 80 feet facing Logan Square, building the low-rise hotel on the square allowed construction of the office building.  Law firm Morgan, Lewis & Bockius was one of the anchor tenant at the property at construction and received an equity stake as part of its lease commitment.

The Rubenstein Company acquired the building along with Two Logan Square in 1997 from Aetna for $55 million. Brandywine Realty Trust acquired the property as part of its acquisition of Rubenstein's portfolio in 2014.

It is currently the 31st-tallest building in Philadelphia.

See also

 List of tallest buildings in Philadelphia
 Buildings and architecture of Philadelphia

References

External links
 Emporis
 SkyscraperPage

Skyscraper office buildings in Philadelphia

Kohn Pedersen Fox buildings
Office buildings completed in 1983